Hlaingbwe (Phlone ; , ,; spelled "Loo pleh") is a town in Kayin State, Myanmar, located on the Hlaingbwe River, which runs from north to south through the town. Most residents are from the Karen ethnic group.

References

External links
 Satellite map at Maplandia.com

Township capitals of Myanmar
Populated places in Kayin State